The Ligue de Hockey Junior A Hockey Experts or Hockey Experts Junior "A" Hockey League is a Junior "A" (Junior "C" Canada-Wide) ice hockey league in the Province of Quebec, Canada.  The league is sanctioned by Hockey Quebec and Hockey Canada.

The league used to be known as the Bois-Francs League and the Reno Sports League.

Teams

External links
Hockey Expert Junior "A" Website

C
C
Hockey Quebec